Athenae or Athenai was a town of ancient Boeotia, on the river Triton, and near Lake Copais. Athenae, along with the neighbouring town of Eleusis, was destroyed by an inundation.

References

Cities in ancient Boeotia
Former populated places in Greece
Lost ancient cities and towns
Destroyed cities